The Public Works and Economic Development Act of 1965 (Pub.L. 89−136, 79 Stat. 552) established the Economic Development Administration in the U.S. Department of Commerce to provide grants to economically distressed communities to support employment and industrial and commercial growth.

History 
The bill became law on August 26, 1965 and was substantially amended by the Economic Development Administration Reform Act of 1998.

Footnotes

United States Department of Commerce
1965 in law
89th United States Congress
United States federal legislation articles without infoboxes